is a Japanese idol singer, actress and fashion model. She is a former member of the Japanese girl group Nogizaka46, and a regular model for the fashion magazine ar.

Life and career
On March 28, 2013, Hori successfully auditioned for the second generation of Nogizaka46, debuting in the theater play 16-nin no Principal Deux, which showcased the newly added second generation members. Hori was chosen as the center for the group's seventh single "Barrette" and has been a core member of the group since. She continues to be active as an idol and on various television programs.

In 2019, Hori debuted as a film actress in a leading role in the film Hot Gimmick: Girl Meets Boy, an adaptation of Miki Aihara's manga Hot Gimmick, playing the role of Hatsumi Narita. Her performance won the Asian New Talent Award - Best Actress category at the Shanghai International Film Festival that year.

On November 27, 2020, Hori released her solo song , and announced her graduation.

Discography

Singles with Nogizaka46

Albums with Nogizaka46

Other featured songs

Filmography

Films

Video on demand

Theater

References

External links
 

 

Living people
1996 births
Japanese idols
Japanese women singers
Japanese film actresses
Japanese female models
Nogizaka46 members
People from Gifu